Karl Boy-Ed (September 14, 1872  –September 14, 1930) was the naval attaché at the Imperial German embassy in Washington, D.C. during World War I.

Biography
Of half Turkish and half German origin, Karl Boy-Ed was born in Lübeck on the German Baltic seacoast; he was the first of three children. His Turkish father,  Carl Johann Boy, was a merchant in Luebeck. In 1878, Carl Johann Boy and his wife Ida Boy-Ed separated. Ida Ed (daughter of Christoph Marquard Ed, a member of the German parliament, publisher, and newspaper editor), moved to Berlin with her son Karl. She worked as a journalist and began writing novels. In 1880 Ida’s estranged husband forced her and Karl to return to Luebeck, as their divorce had not been finalized. She continued on her career as a writer and published an amazing volume of seventy novels and essays. She supported the career of young Thomas Mann and corresponded with his brother Heinrich. As a major influence in the art and music scene in Luebeck, Ida supported the early careers of conductors Wilhelm Furtwaengler and Hermann Abendroth. Thomas Mann regularly stayed overnight in the Boy-Ed household.

Karl Boy-Ed joined the German navy at the age of nineteen. Rising through the ranks to become lieutenant commander, he served on dozens of naval assignments. In 1898 Boy-Ed witnessed the American occupation of the Philippines. Shortly before the Boxer Rebellion, Kaiser Wilhelm’s brother, Prince Heinrich von Preußen sent the navy lieutenant on a secret mission to assess the “value of the Chinese navy.” Boy-Ed considered his report as a major writing accomplishment. In view of the hostilities that broke out with China a year later, Boy-Ed’s “research” certainly was timely. Between 1906 and 1909 Boy-Ed served on the staff of Grand Admiral Alfred von Tirpitz. In this period Boy-Ed took over the “Nachrichten-Abteilung” ("N") (office of naval intelligence) from Paul von Hintze. Department "N" was the precursor of the German Naval Intelligence agency; it collected intelligence on naval affairs and disseminated German propaganda on her own navy.

In the beginning of 1912, his career took Boy-Ed to the United States as naval attaché under the German ambassador to the U.S., Johann Heinrich von Bernstorff. However, he traveled to Jamaica, the Panama Canal Zone and Mexico before he took over the office in Washington D.C. in 1913. Funny, smart, cosmopolitan, extremely well-read and intellectual, he enjoyed popularity and respect among American naval officials before the war.

His area of responsibility also included Mexico, where the ambassadorship had just turned over to Paul von Hintze, Boy-Ed's former boss. As naval attaché, he was responsible for naval matters in North America, mainly intelligence gathering and supply of the German cruiser fleet. Well liked in the US, he regularly was invited to observe American and Canadian naval maneuvers and established a thorough social network. He worked closely with Franz von Papen, later Chancellor of Germany, who took over the job of Military Attache in the United States and Mexico in 1914. Boy-Ed and von Papen established an effective spy and sabotage ring during World War I, aimed at hindering the U.S. from sending aid to the Allies. Some of the more notorious members of this network were Franz von Rintelen, Felix A. Sommerfeld, Horst von der Goltz, and Paul Koenig.

He and von Papen were expelled from the US in December 1915 after several clandestine operations had been reported in American papers. Back in Germany, Boy-Ed took charge of the "N". However, not all was well with the German navy officer. Boy-Ed suffered from phagomania, a constant desire to eat. The disorder required tremendous self-discipline in social circumstances. The other more severe disorder was insomnia. Boy-Ed could not sleep at night, which on the one hand increased his productivity by leaps and bounds but weighed heavily on his health. The stresses of his New York assignment had taken a heavy toll on him physically and mentally. He admitted in his autobiographic sketch that as a result of his wartime assignment his nerves suffered a permanent “crack.” 

In February 1921, he married Virginia G. Mackay-Smith, daughter of Bishop Alexander Mackay-Smith of the Episcopal Diocese of Pennsylvania. After trying to move to the United States in 1926 but being denied a visa by the State Department, Boy-Ed settled in Hamburg, Germany.

He died after a horse-riding accident on his 58th birthday.

References

Sources
 Boy-Ed, Karl.  Peking und Umgebung.  Tientsin: Verl. der Brigade-Zeitung, 1906.  Rpt. Saarbrücken: Fines Mundi, 2012.
 ----------.  Die Vereinigten Staaten von Amerika und der U-Boot-Krieg.  Berlin: Karl Siegismund, 1918.
 ----------.  Verschwörer?  Berlin: August Scherl, 1920.
 Jones, Hollister.  The German Secret Service in America, 1914 to 1918.  Boston: Small, Maynard and Co., 1918.
 von Feilitzsch, Heribert.  In Plain Sight: Felix A. Sommerfeld, Spymaster in Mexico, 1908 to 1914.  Amissville [Virginia]: Henselstone Verl., 2012.    https://books.google.com/books/about/In_Plain_Sight.html?id=GgiMaISMLSoC&redir_esc=y

1872 births
1930 deaths
German people of Turkish descent
Military personnel from Lübeck
World War I spies for Germany
Imperial German Navy personnel of World War I
Deaths by horse-riding accident in Germany
German expatriates in the United States